Tingena plagiatella is a species of moth in the family Oecophoridae. It is endemic to New Zealand and has been observed in both the North and South Islands. This species inhabits light native bush or scrubland. Adults of this species are on the wing from November to January.

Taxonomy
Francis Walker described this species in 1863 using specimens collected by D. Bolton in Auckland and named the species Tinea plagiatella. In 1915 Edward Meyrick placed this species in the genus  Borkhausenia. In 1926 Alfred Philpott studied the genitalia of the male of this species. George Hudson discussed this species under the name Borkhausenia plagiatella in his 1928 publication The butterflies and moths of New Zealand. In 1988 J. S. Dugdale placed this species within the genus Tingena. The male holotype specimen is held in the Natural History Museum, London.

Description 
Meyrick described this species as follows:

Distribution
This species is endemic to New Zealand. It has been observed in Auckland, Tokaanu, Ōrongorongo Valley in the Wellington region and Arthur's Pass. This species has also been found in a site of ecological significance in Christchurch as set out in the Christchurch District Plan as well as at Rakaia Island in Canterbury.

Behaviour 
Adults of this species are on the wing from November to January.

Habitat and hosts 
This species inhabits light native forest or scrubland. The larvae of this species feeds on leaf litter.

References

Oecophoridae
Moths of New Zealand
Moths described in 1863
Endemic fauna of New Zealand
Taxa named by Francis Walker (entomologist)
Endemic moths of New Zealand